Fleischer's syndrome is an extremely rare congenital anomaly characterized by displacement of the nipples, occasional polymastia, and hypoplasia of both kidneys.

References

Congenital disorders
Rare syndromes
Syndromes affecting the kidneys
Nipple